Mary Lynn Wolfe (born 1963) is a Democratic member of the Iowa House of Representatives, representing the 98th district.

Personal life 

Wolfe holds a Bachelor of Arts degree in English and a JD from the University of Iowa. She has been an attorney in private practice with her father.

Political career 
In 2010, Wolfe announced that she would run to represent District 26 in the Iowa House of Representatives, after the former representative, Polly Bukta, announced that she would not run for re-election. She defeated the Republican opponent, David A. Rose, by 424 votes.

Following redistricting in 2011, Wolfe ran to represent District 98 in 2012 and won. She has been re-elected to that seat three times, and is running again in 2020.

Wolfe currently sits on the following committees:
 Agriculture
 Government Oversight
 Judiciary (ranking member)
 Ways and Means

Electoral record

References

External links
 
Twitter account

Living people
Democratic Party members of the Iowa House of Representatives
Politicians from Clinton, Iowa
University of Iowa alumni
Women state legislators in Iowa
21st-century American politicians
21st-century American women politicians
1963 births